Geranium maderense, known as giant herb-Robert or the Madeira cranesbill, is a species of  flowering plant in the family Geraniaceae, native to the island of Madeira. It is sometimes confused with another Madeira endemic, Geranium palmatum.

Spectacular pink flowers on hairy red stems are produced in large panicles in summer. It has gained the Royal Horticultural Society's Award of Garden Merit.

References

External links

maderense
Endemic flora of Madeira
Garden plants of Europe